Candocuronium iodide (INN, formerly chandonium, HS-310) is an aminosteroid neuromuscular-blocking drug. Its use in anesthesia for endotracheal intubation and to provide skeletal muscle relaxation during surgery or mechanical ventilation was briefly evaluated in clinical studies in India. However, further development was discontinued due to attendant cardiovascular effects, primarily tachycardia that was about the same as the clinically established pancuronium bromide. Candocuronium demonstrated a short duration in the body, but a rapid onset of action. It had little to no ganglion blocking activity, with a greater potency than pancuronium.

Background
As with other neuromuscular-blocking agents, candocuronium preferentially antagonizes competitively the nicotinic subtype of acetylcholine receptors. The agent was developed by the laboratory of Harkishan Singh, Panjab University, Chandigarh, India, as part of the search for a non-depolarizing replacement for the most popular clinical depolarizing agent, suxamethonium (succinylcholine).

Design of candocuronium
The mono- and bis-quaternary azasteroid series of compounds to which candocuronium belongs are based on the same principle that led to aminosteroids such as pancuronium, vecuronium and rocuronium: use of the steroid skeleton to provide a somewhat rigid distance between the two quaternary ammonium centers, with appendages incorporating fragments of choline or acetylcholine. The discovery program initiated by Singh initially led to the synthesis of the bis-quaternary non-depolarizing agent HS-342 (4,17a-dimethyl-4,17a-diaza-D-homo-5α-androstane dimethiodide) that was equipotent with tubocurarine and with one-third its duration of action, but not suitable for further clinical evaluation. Modifications of the HS-342 structure  led to two other notable agents, HS-347 and HS-310 (subsequently named chandonium, then candocuronium). HS-347 was equipotent with tubocurarine but exhibited considerable ganglion blocking activity; candocuronium appeared to be suitably placed for clinical trials following encouraging preclinical evaluations.

Modifications to the candocuronium design
Candocuronium did not provide the desired profile, and a further extension of research was undertaken to overcome its limitations. This led to four more potentially useful compounds, HS-692, HS-693, HS-704 and HS-705, whose onset and duration were indinguishable from candocuronium, but all demonstrated profound vagolytic effects and much weaker potencies than candocuronium. To improve on potency, further modifications of the candocuronium nucleus were undertaken, leading to the identification of yet another potentially useful compound, HS-626. Upon further preclinical evaluation, HS-626 demonstrated a slightly more desirable neuromuscular-blocking profile than that of candocuronium, but its overall improvement was insufficient to warrant advancement to clinical testing.

Modifications at 3- and 16-positions of androstane nucleus
The discovery of candocuronium led to numerous related neuromuscular-blocking agents with short durations of action but also having attendant undesirable cardiovascular effects. The Marshall group then explored other modifications at the 3- and 16-positions of the androstane nucleus, and yielded an agent that can go through expanded evaluation to clinical testing.

References

External links
 

Muscle relaxants
Nicotinic antagonists
Quaternary ammonium compounds
Iodides
Pyrrolidines
Neuromuscular blockers